Ursula Germaine of Foix(c. 1488 – 15 October 1536) was an early modern French noblewoman from the House of Foix. By marriage to King Ferdinand II of Aragon, she was Queen of Aragon, Majorca, Naples, Sardinia, Sicily, and Valencia and Princess of Catalonia from 1506 to 1516 and Queen of Navarre from 1512 to 1516. She was Vicereine of Valencia from 1523 until her death in 1536, jointly with her second and third husbands, respectively Johann of Brandenburg-Ansbach and Ferdinand, Duke of Calabria. By her third marriage, she was Duchess of Calabria.

Ancestry 
Ursula Germaine of Foix was born around 1488, possibly in Mazères, Kingdom of France, as the first child of John of Foix, Count of Étampes and Viscount of Narbonne (1457–1500) and his wife, born Marie of Orléans (1457–1493). Through her father, she was the granddaughter of Eleanor, Queen (Regnant) of Navarre (1426–1479), while through her mother, she was the niece of Louis XII, King of France (1462–1515). She had one sibling, a younger brother, acclaimed commanding officer Gaston of Foix, Duke of Nemours ("The Thunderbolt of Italy"; 1489–1512).

Queen of Aragon

Background 

On 26 November 1504, Isabella I, Queen Regnant of the countries of the Crown of Castile and Queen Consort of those in the Crown of Aragon (1451–1504), died. As both her son and her grandsons had already died, the Crown of Castile was inherited by her eldest living daughter, Infanta Joanna ("Joanna the Mad"; 1479–1555) and Joanna's husband, Archduke Philip of Austria, Lord of the Netherlands and Duke of Burgundy ("Philip the Handsome/Fair"; 1478–1506). King Ferdinand II, Isabella's widower and Joanna's father, thus lost control of the countries that he had only ruled jure uxoris (Latin: "by right of [his] wife").

His main concern was that with his own death, the Crown of Aragon would also be inherited by Joanna and Philip, passing most of the Iberian peninsula to the House of Habsburg. This could have been prevented by the birth of a male heir to Ferdinand, who would have displaced Joanna from at least the order of succession of Aragon. As part of an alignment with the Kingdom of France, he agreed to marry Germaine of Foix, niece of King Louis XII. Their engagement was established on 12 October 1505, in 2nd Treaty of Blois, in which Louis XII ceded his claims to the Kingdoms of Naples and Jerusalem to his niece, provided that she had a son from the marriage. Naples was already under Ferdinand's control, while the Kingdom of Jerusalem was practically nonexistent by this time. Through the union, Ferdinand hoped to father a male heir and gain accession to the throne of Navarre.

Marriage 
18-year-old Germaine married 54-year-old Ferdinand on 19 October 1506 in Blois by proxy. She entered her new country in Hondarribia, where Alonso/Alfonso of Aragon, Archbishop of Zaragoza (1468–1520), her husband's illegitimate son received her. She met her husband on 18 March 1507 in Dueñas, where the marriage was consummated; great celebrations followed in Valladolid. The marriage lead to a short period of peace between France and Aragon, but was badly received in Castile, where the majority of people had previously supported Ferdinand's claims, but saw his remarriage as a betrayal of their late queen, his first wife Isabella. The elderly king was a considerate, tender, and respectful husband, who reportedly had much sexual desire for his young wife, as well as for other women.

Ferdinand's son-in-law, Philip, had died on 25 September 1506, only weeks before Ferdinand and Germaine were married. Ferdinand convinced the cortes that Queen Joanna was too mentally ill to govern, and was appointed her guardian and regent of her countries. On 3 May 1509, Germaine gave birth to a son, Infante John, Prince of Girona, who died shortly after his birth. Despite the use of potions, the couple did not have another child. Had John lived, or had they had another son, the Crown of Aragon would have split from the Crown of Castile again, after being semi-united by the marriage of Ferdinand and Isabella. On 28 January 1513, the King granted his wife the Viscounty of Castellbó, a former possession of her family, the House of Foix. While Germaine was not very politically active, she did represent her husband at the 1512 Cortes Generales and the 1515 Cortes of Aragon. She was presiding over the latter when she received news of her husband dying, and she rushed to his deathbed in Madrigalejo.

Queen Dowager 
After two years of health problems, King Ferdinand died on 23 January 1516. He left Germaine Syracuse in Sicily, the towns of Tàrrega, Sabadell and Villagrasa in Catalonia, and Basilicata in Naples, resulting in a yearly income of 50 000 florins, and ordered his grandson Archduke Charles, Lord of the Netherlands (1500–1558) to take care of her. Charles, Queen Joanna's son who had been raised in the Habsburg Netherlands, arrived in Castile in 1517, and Germaine moved from Aragon to be closer to his court, and lived in the Monastery of El Abrojo near Valladolid. At first, her stepgrandson, only 12 years her junior, showed much respect for her, rising from his seat and uncovering his head if she entered the room and addressing her kneeling, but soon abandoned this courtesy. He did, however, grant her Olmedo and Madrigal de las Altas Torres on 19 June 1517 and Arévalo on 15 March 1518. Around this time, she was described as "not very beautiful, somewhat lame, a great lover of lounging around and going to banquets, orchards, gardens, and parties".

On 20 August 1518, more than 2 years after her husband's death, Germaine gave birth to a daughter, Isabella, in Valencia, probably fathered by Charles. In her will, Germaine referred to her daughter as la Serenissima doña Ysabel, Ynfanta de Castilla, hija de la Maj. del Emperador ("the Most Serene Lady Isabella, Infanta of Castile, daughter of His Majesty the Emperor"). In 1519, Charles travelled to Aragon to take his oath as king, and Germaine went with him. While in Barcelona, Charles arranged a marriage for Germaine with Margrave Johann of Brandenburg-Ansbach (1493–1525), a landless cadet of the House of Hohenzollern. He was a cousin of Joachim I Nestor, Prince-elector of the Margraviate of Brandenburg (1499–1535), whose vote Charles needed in order to be elected Holy Roman Emperor. Germaine and Charles then travelled together to Germany where she was married.

Vicereine of Valencia 

In 1523, Charles appointed the couple viceroys of Valencia. In this position, Germaine had to solve the problem of the 1519–1523 Revolt of the Brotherhoods (Catalan: Revolta de les Germanies), an anti-monarchist, anti-feudal autonomist revolt of artisan guilds ("germanias"), inspired by the Italian republics. She imposed harsh punishments on participants, known as agermanats, and is thought to have signed the execution warrants of 100 former rebels. This was the opposite of the more lenient approach of her predecessor, Diego Hurtado de Mendoza, Count of Melito and Lemus (1469–1536), who had worked for reconciliation. In December 1524, Germaine signed a pardon that officially ended the persecution of all agermanats, but fines imposed on guilds and guild-aligned cities would take many years to pay.

Germaine's second marriage was unhappy and abusive, Johann being a violent person engaging in various forms of debauchery. They had no children, and he died in 1525. Germaine remarried a year later, in August 1526 in Seville to Ferdinand, Duke of Calabria (1488–1550), the eldest son of Frederick IV, the deposed king of Naples. The couple were patrons of literature and music, maintaining a Renaissance court. The poets Juan Fernández de Heredia (circa 1310 – 1396), Luis de Milán (circa 1500 – circa 1561), and Baltasar de Romaní (circa 1485 – 1547) were among their protégés. They also collected Greek and Latin codices. Germaine worked towards the gradual integration of Valencia into Castile-dominated Spain. It has been suggested by Valencian historians that Germaine's move to Valencia was the first step towards the degradation of the reputation of the Valencian language, as the higher classes started using Castilian Spanish instead of their first language to please her.

Germaine died on 15 October 1536 in Llíria, Valencia, at the age of 48, probably due to an edema caused by obesity. She was buried in the Monasterio de San Miguel de los Reyes ("Saint Michael of the Kings Monastery"), which she had founded. Her third husband survived her by 14 years and remained Viceroy of Valencia until his death in 1550. He remarried to a widow, Mencía de Mendoza (1508–1554) in 1541 with whom he continued his patronage of arts.

Issue 

 By her first husband, Ferdinand II of Aragon (1452–1516), whom she married in 1505 or 1506:
 John, Prince of Girona (born and died 3 May 1509), who died a few hours after his birth;
 Possibly by her stepgrandson, Charles V, Holy Roman Emperor:
 Infanta Isabella of Castile (20 August 1518 – 1537), died at the age of 19, never married and had no issue.

Arms

Notes

References

Further reading
 

1488 births
1536 deaths
16th-century French women
16th-century women rulers
Aragonese queen consorts
Majorcan queens consort
Royal consorts of Naples
Royal consorts of Sicily
Countesses of Barcelona
Remarried royal consorts
Viceroys of Valencia
Germaine
Germaine
Revolt of the Brotherhoods